André "Doctor Dré" Brown (born December 5, 1963) is an American rapper, radio personality and former MTV VJ.

Early life
André Brown was born and raised in Westbury, New York, on Long Island.

Career

In the early 1980s, Doctor Dré was a DJ at WBAU, the radio station of Adelphi University in Garden City, New York. With three other DJs at the station, he formed the "Concept Crew", which began to create its own music. In 1986, they renamed themselves Original Concept, a hip-hop group that released one album on Def Jam Recordings, Straight from the Basement of Kooley High in 1988, featuring the track was "Pump that Bass."

In a 2018 interview, Doctor Dré described his early college work:

From 1989 to 1995, Doctor Dré and Ed Lover were the co-hosts of MTV's hip hop music program Yo! MTV Raps.

Dré teamed up with Lover in the early 1990s to co-host a morning radio show during the re-launch of radio station Hot 97 (WQHT) in New York City.

The duo starred in the 1993 film Who's the Man?, directed by Yo! MTV Raps co-creator and co-director Ted Demme.

Dré and Ed Lover also recorded an album in 1994 titled Back up off Me! that was released on Relativity Records.

Dré also served as a DJ for the Beastie Boys.

Dré had his own urban clothing line called Bigga Stuff in the early 1990s, but it was never widely distributed.

Dré and Ed Lover participated in the 2003 Comedy Central Roast of their Who's the Man? co-star, comedian Denis Leary.

Guest appearances on TV
He guest-starred on The Fresh Prince of Bel-Air in the episode "Ill Will" as a figment of Will Smith's nightmare of bad doctors. He also appeared on an episode of The People's Court with Judge Marilyn Milian as a witness for a talent director suing former colleagues of his. They won US$1,500, the full amount requested for the gig deposit.

He appeared as a guest on MSNBC's The Beat with Ari Melber on June 1, 2018 along with Yo! MTV Raps co-host Ed Lover. During their segment they promoted the re-boot of the show.

Personal life
Doctor Dré suffers from type 2 diabetes. He had lost his vision in October 2019 and his leg in 2020 due to complications with the disease. He is married to Brigide Brown. He has two children, son Arahmus and daughter Angelique.

Discography

References

External links

1963 births
People from Westbury, New York
People from Long Island
Living people
African-American male actors
African-American television personalities
American male film actors
American radio personalities
Beastie Boys members
VJs (media personalities)
Relativity Records artists
American television personalities
American amputees